Harikumar may refer to:

Harikumar (actor), actor in Tamil movies
Hari Kumar (director), Indian film script writer and director in Malayalam movies
E. Harikumar, Malayalam novelist and short story writer 
N. Harikumar, sound editor and recordist known for his works in Malayalam films
Harikumar Pallathadka, social activist
Hari Kumar Audichya, Indian politician of the Bharatiya Janata Party from Rajasthan
Harikumar Madhavan Nair, Indian film audiographer and sound designer